Svend Rasmussen Svendsen (March 21, 1864 – September 6, 1945) was a Norwegian American impressionist artist. Svendsen is most known for his rural scenes, marine views, and snowy landscapes of Norway.

Background
Svend Rasmussen Svendsen was born at Nittedal in Akershus, Norway. He was the son of Rasmus and Marie Svendsen. Shortly thereafter his family moved to Kristiania (now Oslo) where Svendsen received his primary education. In 1881, he immigrated to America and settled in Chicago, Illinois.

Career
Svendsen had studied with Norwegian painter and engraver Fritz Thaulow. Svendsen also studied with Edward F. Ertz, Professor of Watercolor at the Académie Delécluse in Paris. Svendsen exhibited at the Chicago Art Institute, the National Academy of Design, and the Pennsylvania Academy of Fine Arts. His paintings were shown at the Chicago Norske Klub and at Minnesota State Fair. His art was also featured at the Pan-American Exposition in Buffalo, NY during  1901.

Since his death, the art work of Svend Svendsen has been included in exhibitions featured at St. Olaf College, at the University of Minnesota and at the Spanierman Gallery in Chicago. His art is on display at the National Museum of American Art at the Smithsonian Institution.

Awards
Young Fortnightly prize by the Chicago Art Institute (1895)
Bronze medal at the St. Louis Exposition (1904)

Personal life
He was married to May Isabel Newton (1874-1950) with whom he had five children. Svend Svendsen died in Chicago during 1945.

References

Other Sources
Strand, A.E.   (1905) A History of the Norwegians of Illinois (Chicago, IL: John Anderson Publishing Co.)
Haugan, Reidar Rye  (1933) Prominent Artists and Exhibits of Their Work in Chicago (Chicago Norske Klub. Nordmanns-Forbundet, 24: 371–374, Volume 7)
Lovoll, Odd S. (1988) A Century of Urban Life: the Norwegians in Chicago before 1930 (Northfield, MN: Norwegian-American Historical Association)

Related Reading
Gerdts, William The Friedman Collection: Artists of Chicago (Spanierman Gallery, LLC, NY, 2002)

1864 births
1944 deaths
People from Nittedal
19th-century Norwegian painters
19th-century American male artists
20th-century Norwegian painters
Norwegian male painters
Artists from Chicago
Norwegian emigrants to the United States
Norwegian Impressionist painters
American Impressionist painters
20th-century American painters
American male painters
Académie Delécluse alumni
20th-century American male artists
19th-century Norwegian male artists
20th-century Norwegian male artists